An election to Somerset County Council took place on 4 June 2009 as part of the 2009 United Kingdom local elections, having been delayed from 7 May, to coincide with elections to the European Parliament. The result brought to an end 16 years of Liberal Democrat rule to a Conservative controlled administration.  58 councillors were elected from various electoral divisions, which returned one county councillor each. Members were elected by the first-past-the-post voting system for a four-year term of office. This was the last election before the number of seats was cut to 55 for the 2013 election. With a total of 58 seats being reduced to 55 for the next election.

All locally registered electors (British, Irish, Commonwealth and European Union citizens) who were aged 18 or over on Thursday 2 May 2013 were entitled to vote in the local elections. Those who were temporarily away from their ordinary address (for example, away working, on holiday, in student accommodation or in hospital) were also entitled to vote in the local elections, although those who had moved abroad and registered as overseas electors cannot vote in the local elections. It is possible to register to vote at more than one address (such as a university student who had a term-time address and lives at home during holidays) at the discretion of the local Electoral Register Office, but it remains an offence to vote more than once in the same local government election.

Summary
The Liberal Democrats lost overall control of the council to the Conservatives who went on to form a majority administration. The Liberal Democrat group became the council's official opposition. Meanwhile the Labour Party had their number of seats halved from 4 to 2. No independents or candidates from other parties were elected as councillors.

Overall results

|}

Results by division
The candidates in bold were elected councillors on 4 June 2009.

Blackdown & Wellington East

Blackmoor Vale

Brent

Bridgwater East & Bawdrip

Bridgwater North & Central

Bridgwater South

Bridgwater West

Burnham on Sea North

Cannington

Castle Cary

Chard North

Chard South

Cheddar

Coker

Crewkerne

Curry Rivel

Dulverton & Exmoor

Dunster

Frome North

Frome Selwood

Frome South

Glastonbury

Highbridge & Burnham on Sea South

Huntspill

Ilchester

Ilminster

King Alfred

Langport

Lydeard

Martock

Mendip Central & East

Mendip North East

Mendip North West

Mendip South

Mendip West

Minehead

North Curry

North Petherton

Shepton Mallet

Somerton

South Petherton

Staplegrove

Street

Taunton & Trull

Taunton East

Taunton Fairwater

Taunton North

Taunton South

Taunton West

Upper Tone

Watchet & Quantocks

Wellington

Wells

Wincanton & Bruton

Yeovil East

Yeovil North & Central

Yeovil South

Yeovil West

References

2009
2009 English local elections
2000s in Somerset